The Treaty of Amritsar of 1809 was an agreement between the British East India Company and Maharaja Ranjit Singh, the Sikh leader who founded the Sikh empire. The EIC's intention of this treaty was to gain Singh’s support if the French invaded India and Singh’s intention was to further consolidate his territorial gains south of the Sutlej River after establishing the river as their respective border. Singh wanted to officially absorb the Malwa Sikhs in his kingdom, which resided between the Sutlej and Yamuna Rivers, thus unifying all Sikhs of Punjab within his kingdom.

Background

Ranjit Singh (1780-1839) was a Sikh warrior who had been establishing a kingdom in then northern India. He had established a capital at Lahore in 1799, proclaimed himself maharajah of the Punjab in 1801 and expanded his territories to such an extent that by 1808 he had control of an area bounded by the Jhelum and Sutlej Rivers. The Sikh chiefs of the Malwa region appealed to the British for protection from Singh fearing he would soon absorb them into his kingdom. The EIC declined because of the pending rumored invasion from Napoleon and Russia after they had signed the Treaty of Tilsit in 1807. They needed Singh as an ally because his kingdom was between Russia and India, serving as an ideal buffer state from an attack.

Singh accepted the EIC’s invitation to meet EIC diplomat Charles Metcalfe to discuss the possible French Russian invasion. After months of negotiations, Singh invaded Malwa to prove to Metcalfe his hold over the region and establish the Yamuna River as his border. The EIC responded by sending their troops to the Sutlej River to declare this as their border and force Singh to agree to the treaty. However, Singh challenged them, sending his troops across the river facing the EIC troops.

At this time, Napoleon's forces attacked Spain and seemed very unlikely to attack India. Thus, the EIC changed their policy of aggression because they no longer needed Singh for an alliance. They submitted a new treaty allowing Singh to retain some his conquests south of the Sutlej in Malwa, but the Sutlej would remain their border. Unaware of the changed EIC outlook, Singh concluded it was best not to risk war realizing his relative military weakness and agreed to sign the updated treaty.

Although the terms of the treaty prevented Singh from any further territorial expansion south of the Sutlej, it permitted him complete freedom of action to the north of it. This enabled him to extend his rule over rival Sikh Misls and ultimately expand to areas such as Peshawar, Multan and Kashmir by defeating the Afghan Durrani Empire. The unification of these territories aided by his French generals Westernising his armies, formed the Sikh empire that lasted until British subjugation in 1849.

Gallery

See also 
List of treaties
Treaty of Lahore

References 

Treaties of the British East India Company
Indian documents
1809 in India
1809 treaties
Amritsar
Amritsar